A tach or tachometer is a measurement device for RPMs.

Tach may also refer to:
 Triazacyclohexane (TACH), a class of chemicals
 HD Tach (software), a graphing program

People with the surname
 Laura Tach, American academic

People with the given name
 Tach Sharakat, Kalasha of Pakistan, one of the first literate Kalasha

See also

 Taché (disambiguation)
 Taching (disambiguation)
 Tachycardia, a racing heartbeat
 Tack (disambiguation)
 Tash (disambiguation)
 Toch (disambiguation)
 Tock
 Tosh (disambiguation)